Liceu is a Barcelona Metro station situated under the La Rambla between Gran Teatre del Liceu and Mercat de la Boqueria in the Barri Gòtic, part of Barcelona's district of Ciutat Vella. It is served by TMB-operated Barcelona Metro line L3.

The station consists of a single level, on which there are two tracks served by two side platforms. The station has two pairs of street entrances, with one pair at the Teatre del Liceu end of the station and the other at the Mercat end. Each entrance in a pair leads only to one of the two platforms, and there is no connection between the two platforms without exiting the station and returning to street level.

The station was opened on 15 July 1925 as the southern terminus of the Gran Metropolitano de Barcelona from Lesseps station. At first it just had entrances at the Teatre del Liceu end of the station, but in the 1960s new accesses were added at the other end of the station. In 1946, the line was extended a short distance south to Fernando station, which closed when the line was further extended to Drassanes station in 1968. The station was completely rebuilt between 2007 and 2008 to make it more accessible.

Liceu is the first station of Barcelona Metro network with a themed decoration. The walls are illuminated and decorated with pictures of leaves of the London Plane trees that can be found on La Rambla. There is also a ceramic mural made by the Escola Massana in the station's southern vestibule.

Gallery

References

External links
 
 Information about the station from the TMB web site
 Information and photos about the station at Trenscat.com
 History and antique photos about the station
 Photo of the imitation of the former "modernist" sign

Barcelona Metro line 3 stations
La Rambla, Barcelona
Railway stations in Spain opened in 1925
Transport in Ciutat Vella